Nazil Rural District is a rural district (dehestan) in Nukabad District, Khash County, Sistan and Baluchestan province, Iran. At the 2006 census, its population was 10,573, in 2,491 families.  The rural district has 119 villages.

References 

Rural Districts of Sistan and Baluchestan Province
Khash County